Brewers may refer to:

 Milwaukee Brewers, a Major League Baseball team based in Milwaukee, Wisconsin
Helena Brewers, a minor league baseball team of the Pioneer League based in Helena, Montana
Arizona League Brewers, aka Phoenix Brewers, a minor league baseball team of the Arizona League based in Phoenix, Arizona
Beloit Brewers, a minor league baseball team, now known as the Beloit Snappers, based in Beloit, Wisconsin.
Milwaukee Brewers (1901), the original Major League Baseball team that played as the Brewers, now the Baltimore Orioles
Milwaukee Brewers (American Association), a 1902–1952 U.S. minor league baseball team
Milwaukee Brewers (1886–92), an 1891 U.S. baseball team of the American Association
 Mascot of Vassar College, a co-educational college in Poughkeepsie, New York
 Burton Albion Football Club, an English football (soccer) team nicknamed The Brewers

See also
 Brewing
 Brewer (disambiguation)